The 1961–62 DDR-Oberliga was the 13th season of the DDR-Oberliga, the first tier of league football in East Germany. It was the first season played in the traditional autumn-spring format again after the Oberliga had played for six seasons from 1955 to 1960 in the calendar year format instead, modelled on the system used in the Soviet Union. The league was played as a triple round with a home-and-away round and an additional round of games at neutral venues to allow for an earlier start.

The league was contested by fourteen teams. National People's Army club ASK Vorwärts Berlin won the championship, the club's second consecutive one and third overall, eventually winning six national East German championships overall. On the strength of the 1961–62 title Vorwärts qualified for the 1962–63 European Cup where the club was knocked out by Dukla Prague in the preliminary round. Eleventh-placed club SC Chemie Halle qualified for the 1962–63 European Cup Winners' Cup as the seasons FDGB-Pokal winner and was knocked out by OFK Beograd in the preliminary round as well.

Arthur Bialas of SC Empor Rostock was the league's top scorer with 23 goals.

The 1961–62 season saw the third-most games played in an Oberliga season, 273. Only 1950–51 and 1951–52 had there been more, 306 and 342, when the league consisted of 18 and 19 clubs. The season also saw the lowest-ever average attendance with 8,088 per match.

Table									
The 1961–62 season saw two newly promoted clubs, SC Turbine Erfurt and BSG Lokomotive Stendal.

Results

First and second round

Third round

References

Sources

External links
 Das Deutsche Fussball Archiv  Historic German league tables

Cup
1961
Ober